The passer-through-walls, translated as The Man Who Walked through Walls, The Walker-through-Walls or The Man who Could Walk through Walls, is a short story published by Marcel Aymé in 1941.

Plot summary 

A man named Dutilleul lived in Montmartre in 1943. In his forty-third year, he discovered that he possessed the ability to pass effortlessly through walls. In search of a cure he consulted a doctor, who prescribed intensive work and a medicine. Dutilleul made no change to his rather inactive life, however, and a year later still retained his ability to pass through walls, although with no inclination to use it. However, a new manager arrived at his office and began to make his job unbearable. Dutilleul began using his power to annoy his manager, who went mad and was taken away to an asylum. Dutilleul then began to use his ability to burgle banks and jewellery shops. Each time, he would sign a pseudonym "The Lone Wolf" in red chalk at the crime scene, and his criminal exploits soon became the talk of the town. In order to claim the prestige and celebrity status "The Lone Wolf" had gained, Dutilleul allowed himself to be caught in the act. He was put in prison, but used his ability to frustrate his jailers and repeatedly escape.

He then fell in love with a married woman, whose husband went out every night and left her locked in her bedroom. Dutilleul used his power to enter her bedroom and spend the night with her while her husband was away. One morning, Dutilleul had a headache and took two pills he found in the bottom of his drawer. His headache went away, but later that night, as he was leaving his lover's house, he noticed a feeling of resistance as he was passing through the walls. The pills Dutilleul had thought were aspirin were, in fact, the medicine his doctor had prescribed for him a year earlier. As he was passing through the final outer wall of the property, he noticed he was no longer able to move. He realized his mistake too late.  The medicine suddenly took effect, and Dutilleul ended up trapped in the wall, where he remains to this day.

Adaptations 
The story has inspired several cinematic adaptations, including the following:
 1951 – French comedy farce film Le Passe-muraille, directed by Jean Boyer (director)| with Bourvil starring
 1959 – German The Man Who Walked Through the Wall, directed by Ladislao Vajda. 
 1977 – French TV film , directed by Pierre Tchernia with Michel Serrault starring.
 2007 – French short animation film , directed by Damien Henry.
 2016 – French TV film , directed by Dante Desarthe.

The story is also the basis of the 1997 stage musical  (or in its 2002 English-language adaptation, Amour).

References 

The information in this article is based on that in its French equivalent.

External links 
English translation

French short stories
Fantasy short stories
Short stories adapted into films
Works by Marcel Aymé